Bertrand Amoussou-Guenou (born May 29, 1966) is a retired French mixed martial artist and judoka. He is a trainer for his younger brother Karl of Team Amoussou and, following official recognition of mixed martial arts in France, became the president of the national sanctioning body, the Commission National de Mixed Martial Arts, in January 2008. On 1 October 2013, Amoussou assumed the position of president of the International Mixed Martial Arts Federation (IMMAF).

Life and career
Amoussou was born in Dakar, Senegal to a Beninese instructor of judo and karate. At the age of four he moved to France and began his training in judo in January 1977.

Amoussou was a national champion in judo and, as a member of the French national team for ten years, became  the bronze medalist (78 kg) at the 1990 European Judo Championships. Amoussou became three-time world champion in Ju-Jitsu Combat (practically an amalgamation of judo and karate) and also trained kickboxing with French full contact karateka Dominique Valera.

In 2004, Amoussou became the first Frenchman to win a Pride Fighting Championship bout. He also served as an ambassador for ju-jitsu at the 2010 SportAccord Combat Games in Beijing.

In 2008 Amoussou became the president of the national sanctioning body, the Commission National de Mixed Martial Arts, which was later to change its name to the Commission Française de Mixed Martial Arts. In October 2013, he ascended to the role of president of the International Mixed Martial Arts Federation (IMMAF) and oversaw the first IMMAF World Championships of Amateur MMA in Las Vegas (USA) in June - July 2014.

Mixed martial arts record

|-
|Win
|align=center|1-0-1
|  Rao Rao
| TKO (punches)
| Pride Bushido 3
| 
|align=center|2
|align=center|0:29
|Yokohama, Kanagawa, Japan
|
|-
|Loss
|align=center|0-0-1
|  Mushtaq Abdullah
| Submission (rear naked choke)
|Brazil Open - '95
|
|align=center|1
|align=center|2:33
|Brazil
|

References

External links
 

1966 births
Living people
French mixed martial artists of Black African descent
Mixed martial artists utilizing judo
French male judoka
Mixed martial arts trainers
French sportspeople of Beninese descent
Senegalese emigrants to France
Sportspeople from Dakar
Black French sportspeople